Binary delta compression is a technology used in software deployment for distributing patches.

Explanation 
Downloading large amounts of data over the Internet for software updates can induce high network traffic problems, especially when a network of computers is involved. Binary Delta Compression technology allows a major reduction of download size by only transferring the difference between the old and the new files during the update process.

Implementation 
In real-world implementations, it is common to also use standard compression techniques (such as Lempel-Ziv) while compressing. This makes sense because LZW already works by referring back to re-used strings. ZDelta is a good example of this, as it is built from ZLib. The algorithm works by referring to common patterns not only in the file to be compressed, but also in a source file. The benefits of this are that even if there are few similarities between the original and the new file, a good data compression ratio is attained.

See also 
 Delta encoding
 Remote Differential Compression

External links
White paper for Microsoft's implementation of BDC technology
A binary delta compression used by google for rolling out its updates with less size

Software distribution